Leonard Roy Woolf (12 November 1921 – 8 November 2014) was an Australian rules footballer who played with Hawthorn in the Victorian Football League (VFL).

Notes

External links 

1921 births
Australian rules footballers from Victoria (Australia)
Hawthorn Football Club players
2014 deaths